Ashanga is a rural locality (an ulus) in Khorinsky District, Republic of Buryatia, Russia. The population was 223 as of 2010. There are 5 streets.

Geography 
Ashanga is located 45 km northeast of Khorinsk (the district's administrative centre) by road. Amgalanta is the nearest rural locality.

References 

Rural localities in Khorinsky District